Oscar Meredith Weatherby  (February 25, 1915 – June 27, 1997) was an American publisher who was the founder of Weatherhill Publications. He spent a large part of his life in Japan and is known in particular for his English translations of literary works by Yukio Mishima.  Weatherby was also a long-term patron and romantic partner of the photographer Tamotsu Yato.

He also appeared in an acting role in the 1970 war movie Tora! Tora! Tora!, in which he played the part of the U.S. Ambassador to Japan, Joseph Grew.

A native of Waco, Texas, Weatherby died in La Jolla, California.

Filmography

References

External links 
 Donald Richie, The Japan Journals: 1947-2004, Stone Bridge Press (2005)
 Hugh Cortazzi (ed.), Japan Experiences: Fifty Years, One Hundred Views, Routledge (2001), pp. 115–116.

 http://wwwsshe.murdoch.edu.au/intersections/issue12/takahashi_interview.html

American publishers (people)
1915 births
1997 deaths
20th-century American businesspeople
American LGBT businesspeople
People from Waco, Texas
American gay actors
20th-century American LGBT people
American expatriates in Japan